The Fischer & Söhne AG Switzerland is a Swiss plastics processing company based in Muri AG.

History 
The company A. Fischer was founded in 1923 in Dietikon by Alois Fischer for the production of sheet metal packings. In 1952, production began to produce carton and paper containers of up to 25 liters capacity. In 1955, the company, with 15 employees, moved into a new building in Mutschellen. In 1959, the company was transformed into the "Fischer Söhne AG" company. In 1960, the first extrusion blow-molding plant for 10-liter containers was put into operation. This means that the company is entering plastic production. In 1967, the company, now with 40 employees, moves to its current location in Muri, in the canton of Aargau. In 1971 the family Fischer withdrew from the company and in 1980 the company was bought up by today's shareholders. In 1997 the company started the production of "Smart Cards". With the production of these prepaid cards for public telephone cells, the company deserves an extraordinary first. It continues to expand its production in 2002. In 2003 there was a massive slump in demand due to the spread of mobile phones. 1998 founding of the daughter company Fischer S.A. De C.V. Mexico, the production plant in Mexico. In 2002 Fischer & Söhne AG Switzerland took over the company Polar in Eschenbach. The main interest is in the medical technology production of Polar. The technology will be transferred to Muri by 2005, the Eschenbach site will be abandoned and the majority of the former employees of the Polar will receive the termination. Within this time the smart card manufacturing is converted to the production site for medical technology. 2011 A new extrusion blow molding facility is being built.
In 2011, a new extrusion blow hall was established. In 2014, Fischer Söhne AG Switzerland presented the first Swiss barrier coating capsule for Nespresso systems. Since 2014, the corresponding Swiss MPlast GmbH (Limited Liability Company) has also received its postal address at the Fischer Söhne AG.

Fischer Söhne is among others certified according to ISO 9001: 2000. In 2013, the company became a member of Swiss Plastics (SwiPla), an industry association founded in 1992 in Switzerland .

Education/Training
Fischer & Söhne AG Switzerland offers the following apprenticeships:
 Merchant
 Plastic technologist (specialized in injection molding and extrusion blow-molding)
 Toolmaker / PolyMechanic

The company also made it possible for the plastics technologists apprentices of the Adval Tech Holding to learn and complete their second specialty extrusion blow-molding at Fischer & Söhne AG Switzerland.

Products
 Containers & closures of various types.
 Traffic signaling
 Medical Technology / Implants / Pharmaceutical Packaging / Accessories for Healthcare
 Phone cards
 Technical plastic parts / industry
Automobile
In the case of traffic signaling, it should be mentioned that the signaling elements, manufactured by the Fischer Söhne AG Switzerland, in particular the so-called " Biene-Maja" posts, are less damaged in a collision, and also damage the colliding vehicle less, compared with the conventional, Traffic elements. Because  they yield in contrast to conventional traffic elements. In the case of smartcard production, Fischer Söhne AG had the monopoly in Switzerland. The company was one of the two main suppliers of such cards for  Giesecke & Devrient. In contrast to the competitor, where the recess for the chip was later milled, Fischer Söhne AG Switzerland manufactured this in a single manufacturing process by means of pressing it with a stamp inside  the injection molding tool. In the still hot plastic.

References

External links
 Homepage Fischer & Söhne AG Switzerland

Swiss companies established in 1923
Plastics companies of Switzerland
Chemical companies established in 1922